Spring and Autumn Courts (春秋决狱) were an ancient Chinese judicial system, in which judges judge how to convict a case based on the ideas of righteousness of the Spring and Autumn Annals. The Spring and Autumn Courts began in the reign of Emperor Wu of Han and continued until the Tang dynasty when Confucianism and Jurisprudence merged to create the "unity of ritual and law".

History 

In the early years of the Western Han, most of the government's laws came from the Qin dynasty. However, as history developed the overly harsh  could not adapt to social development. As Confucianism gradually gained the attention of the central government, especially after the reign of Emperor Wu of Han, he "dismissed the hundred schools and implemented ", making Confucian thought orthodox.

Dong Zhongshu was involved in important court positions, and even after he retired, the court would still seek his advice on cases. Dong Zhongshu and others organized and edited the Spring and Autumn Decisions, using the Spring and Autumn Period and other Confucian classics as a guide. This book contains 232 typical cases decided by the Spring and Autumn to serve as a reference basis for judging cases.

Evaluation

Positive 
"The core of the "Spring and Autumn Judgment" is "conviction on the heart", that is, determining the guilt or innocence of a person according to his or her subjective motivation, intentions, and desires and the sentencing of the person. The Spring and Autumn system limits to some extent the problem of penal strangulation of families and has helped to mitigate the harsh legal system since the Qin dynasty. The "Spring and Autumn Jailbreak" stabilized the Han dynasty regime to a certain extent and brought Confucianism into the law, further strengthening the influence of Confucianism on the ruling class.

Negative 
Due to its certain subjectivity and ambiguity, especially the blurring of the boundaries between morality and law as well, it also provides some basis for the rulers' subjective will of the ruler to decide the case or even to convict someone for punishment.It actually expands the influence of the subjective judgment of the case judge, and also makes the case judgment produce a certain arbitrariness, thus bringing negative impact to the final result of the case judgment.

See also 
 Mens rea

References 

Legal terminology
Legal doctrines and principles
Legal history of China